Captain Hazel LeRoy Wallace DFC (13 November 1897 – 22 March 1976) was a Canadian First World War flying ace, officially credited with 14 victories. His record shows him to have been a notable team player in squadron tactics.

Wallace originally served with 9 Squadron RNAS in 1917 as a Sopwith Camel pilot. He won his first dogfights there, sharing victories on 6 and 16 September 1917 with Joseph Stewart Temple Fall and several other pilots. He then transferred to 1 Squadron RNAS in early 1918. On 11 March 1918, he scored a solo victory, driving an Albatros D.V down out of control. Five days later, he shared a win with Maxwell Findlay. Wallace would not score again until 2 May, when he, Reginald Brading, Samuel Kinkead, and several other British pilots sent a hapless German observation plane down out of control; Wallace thus became an ace.

His next triumph on the morning of 15 May was more of the same, as Wallace, Findlay, Kinkead, Brading, Charles Dawson Booker, Robert McLaughlin, and three other British pilots pounced upon and destroyed an Albatros D.V. A solo "out of control" win on the afternoon patrol for the 15th, and another the next day put Wallace's tally at eight.

He then transferred to 3 Squadron as the commander of C Flight. On 20 July 1918, he and Adrian Franklyn drove a Hannover two-seater observation plane down out of control. He continued to score with his new unit–mostly solo victories, but with one win shared with George R. Riley–bringing his total to thirteen by 21 August. The next day, he became a balloon buster, teaming with Riley to bring down a German observation balloon. Though he scored no further victories, his Distinguished Flying Cross was awarded on 2 November 1918.

Text of citations
Lieut. (T./Capt.) Hazel Le Roy Wallace.

A gallant and most capable leader, who in many engagements has displayed marked ability and courage, notably in a recent attack on an aerodrome when he led his flight against the group of hangars allotted to him at an altitude of between 100 and 200 feet. By direct hits he destroyed three enemy aeroplanes and set fire to a hangar by machine-gun fire. In addition to above this officer has destroyed four aeroplanes and driven three down out of control.

References
 Above the Trenches: A Complete Record of the Fighter Aces and Units of the British Empire Air Forces 1915-1920 Christopher F. Shores, Norman L. R. Franks, Russell Guest. Grub Street, 1990. , .

Websites

Notes

Canadian aviators
Canadian World War I flying aces
1897 births
1976 deaths
Recipients of the Distinguished Flying Cross (United Kingdom)
Recipients of the Distinguished Service Cross (United Kingdom)
Royal Naval Air Service aviators